A hair tattoo or scalp micropigmentation (SMP for short), is a non-surgical, superficial cosmetic tattoo that gives the illusion of a close buzz cut hairstyle on a bald head or density to a thinning crown. The procedure can also be used to conceal scars from hair transplantation and hide the visual impact of burns or scars on the head. Scalp micropigmentation can be performed on all ethnicities. This procedure does not involve local anesthesia during the procedure. In contrast to traditional tattoos, this treatment is superficial in that it penetrates the epidermal level of the skin, and ink is deposited in the upper dermal level of the skin in order to avoid macro impressions. The advantages of this procedure is that the hairline can be adjusted or touched up with relative ease. 

The cost of scalp micropigmentation depends on a variety of factors, such as location, proximity of the clinic, and the severity of hair loss. The procedure takes three to four sessions which usually last about two hours each. The chosen ink color matches the current color of the hair follicle. Although scalp micropigmentation is a permanent treatment, it can be removed with laser treatment. There are no scientific data on whether people have suffered side effects over the past ten years as long as the ink used is from a reputable distributor. Practitioners may opt to perform a small patch test on an inconspicuous part of the scalp before performing the full treatment to rule out allergies to the ink. When researching a location that offers this service, the hairline is one of the most crucial aspects of the treatment. If this procedure is not done properly, it can in some cases leave the patron with an unnatural finish.

References

Tattoo designs
Human hair
Tattooing by body part